He Was a Warlock is an EP by the English multi-instrumentalist Duke Garwood. It was released by Fire Records on May 25, 2009.

Track listing

References

Duke Garwood albums
2009 EPs
Fire Records (UK) EPs